Lady Gabriella Marina Alexandra Ophelia Kingston (née Windsor; born 23 April 1981) is an English socialite and freelance writer. She is the daughter of Prince and Princess Michael of Kent. She is currently 55th in the line of succession to the British throne. At her birth she was 18th.

Early life and education
Lady Gabriella was born at St Mary's Hospital, London. She has an elder brother, Frederick, born on 6 April 1979. She was christened on 8 June 1981 at the Chapel Royal, St James's Palace, London. Lady Gabriella's godparents were Constantine II of Greece; Mariano Hugo, Prince of Windisch-Graetz; Marina Ogilvy; Princess Antonia, Marchioness of Douro; and Lady Elizabeth Shakerley. She was educated at Godstowe and Downe House School in Cold Ash, Berkshire. In May 2004, Gabriella graduated from Brown University in Providence, Rhode Island, with a BA degree in Comparative Literature and Hispanic studies. In 2012, she earned an MPhil degree in Social Anthropology from Linacre College, Oxford.

Career
Lady Gabriella works as a freelance journalist. She contributes to The London Magazine amongst other publications.

She is a board director of the Playing for Change Foundation, a global music and arts education nonprofit. Additionally, she has done projects in Latin America, including teaching English in Rio de Janeiro and working on music events in Buenos Aires.

In 2020, as a singer-songwriter, she released 2 songs; "Out of Blue" and "Bam Bam" to raise money for a charity. She also sang "Put the Sea", "Half" and "This Morning".

Personal life
For three years in the early 2000s she dated journalist Aatish Taseer. The two met when she was an undergraduate at Brown University and he a graduate of Amherst College working for Time magazine. In 2018, he wrote a controversial article about his relationship with Lady Gabriella and the royal family for Vanity Fair.

Lady Gabriella's engagement to Bristol University graduate and financier Thomas Henry Robin Kingston (b. 22 June 1978) was announced by Buckingham Palace on 19 September 2018. Thomas's father is lawyer William Martin Kingston KC, and his mother, Jill Mary Kingston née Bache, is the granddaughter of Sir William Joseph Pearman-Smith of Park Hall. Thomas and Lady Gabriella became engaged on the Isle of Sark in August 2018. The wedding took place at St George's Chapel, Windsor Castle, on 18 May 2019 and was attended by Elizabeth II and Prince Philip, Duke of Edinburgh. Lady Gabriella fainted at the Queen's lying-in-state ceremony at Westminster Hall on 14 September 2022.

References

1981 births
Living people
Alumni of Linacre College, Oxford
Brown University alumni
English journalists
English women singer-songwriters
English women writers
Gabriella Kingston, Lady
People educated at Downe House School
People from Paddington
Socialites from London
Writers from London